Doris elegans is a species of sea slug, a dorid nudibranch, a marine gastropod mollusc in the family Dorididae.

Distribution
The type locality is not given and this species has not been recognised by subsequent authors.

References

Dorididae
Gastropods described in 1832